Train to Alcatraz is a 1948 American prison film directed by Philip Ford and starring Don Barry, Janet Martin, William Phipps, Roy Barcroft, and June Storey.

Plot
Criminals on a train bound for an infamous supermax prison plan to escape, and to do so they receive outside help.

Cast
Don Barry as Doug Forbes 
Janet Martin as Beatrice
William Phipps as 	Tommy Callahan
Roy Barcroft as Guard Grady
June Storey as Virginia Marley
Jane Darwell as Aunt Ella
Milburn Stone as Bart Kanin
Chester Clute as Train Conductor Yelvington
Ralph Dunn as U.S. Marshal Mark Stevens
Richard Irving as Andy Anders
John Alvin as Nick
Denver Pyle as Hutch Hutchins
Iron Eyes Cody as Geronimo
Kenneth MacDonald as Guard Reeves
Harry Harvey as George
Don Haggerty as Billings
John Doucette as McHenry

See also
List of prison films

References

External links 
 
 
 

1948 films
American prison films
Films directed by Philip Ford
Republic Pictures films
1940s English-language films
1940s American films